Rhumspringe is a municipality in the district of Göttingen, in Lower Saxony, Germany. It is part of the Eichsfeld. The source of the river Rhume is at Rhume Spring in Rhumspringe.

References

Göttingen (district)